The Lumbee are a Native American people primarily centered in Robeson, Hoke, Cumberland, and Scotland counties in North Carolina.

The Lumbee Tribe of North Carolina is a state-recognized tribe in North Carolina numbering approximately 55,000 enrolled members.

The Lumbee take their name from the Lumber River, which winds through Robeson County. Pembroke, North Carolina, is their economic, cultural, and political center. According to the 2000 United States census report, 89% of the population of the town of Pembroke identified as Lumbee; 40% of Robeson County's population identified as Lumbee.

The Lumbee Tribe was recognized by North Carolina in 1885. In 1956, the U.S. Congress passed the Lumbee Act which recognized the Lumbees as being American Indians but denied them benefits of a federally recognized tribe.

History

Early historical references

Archaeological evidence reveals that the area now known as Robeson County (central to modern Lumbee territory) has been continuously occupied by Native people for at least 14,000 years. Every named era found elsewhere in pre-European-contact North Carolina is also present in the archaeological record of Robeson County (artifacts from Paleo-Indian, Archaic, Woodland, and Mississippian cultures). All modern vicinities of Lumbee occupation contain numerous archaeological sites as recent as the Late Woodland period (mid-1700s), and oral traditions about the history of some Lumbee families extend back as far in Robeson County as the mid-1700s.

The earliest European document referring to Indian communities in the area of the Lumber River is a map prepared in 1725 by John Herbert, the English commissioner of Indian trade for the Wineau Factory on the Black River. Herbert identified the four Siouan-speaking communities as the Saraw, Pee Dee, Scavano, and Wacoma. Modern-day Lumbees claim connection to those settlements, but none of the four tribes is located within the boundaries of present-day Robeson County.

When this area was first surveyed by the English in the 1750s, they reported that "No Indians" lived in Bladen County, which then included parts of present-day Robeson County. Colonial Welsh timber survey parties of the same areas also reported, "No Hostile Indians, in fact No Indians to be found at all." The adjacent Anson County was identified as "a frontier to the Indians".

In 1754, colonial authorities organized the territory: everything north of the Lumber River was made part of Bladen County, and everything south of the Lumber River was made part of Anson County. Anson County's border stretched west to known Cherokee territory. Historical records are unclear as to which parts of Anson County were occupied by Indians in the early colonial period.

A 1772 proclamation by the governor of North Carolina, Arthur Dobbs — derived from a report by his agent, Colonel Rutherford, head of a Bladen County militia — listed the names of inhabitants who took part in a "Mob Railously Assembled together," apparently defying the efforts of colonial officials to collect taxes. The proclamation declared the "Above list of Rogus is all living upon the Kings Land without title." A later colonial military survey described "50 families a mixt crew, a lawless People possess the Lands without Patent or paying quit Rents." The surnames of some of the families are the same as modern-day Lumbees, but each family must be traced separately to identify individual ancestors, particularly since extensive intermarriage took place. The families were classified then as "mulattos," a term that then had several different meanings. Today, it is most commonly used to describe mixed-race persons of African-European ancestry. However, at the time, the term was also used across the South to describe any non-white individual.

Following the Reconstruction Era, white-dominated legislatures in the South imposed legal racial segregation. They required all non-white people or people of color to attend black schools in which most students were the children of freedmen. In 1885, Democratic state representative Hamilton McMillan supported an effort to gain separate schools for the Indian children in the state since they and their ancestors had always been free and refused to send their children to black schools. In making his case, McMillan wrote that Lumbee ancestor James Lowrie had received sizable land grants early in the century and, by 1738, possessed combined estates of more than 2,000 acres (810 ha). Adolph Dial and David Eliades claimed that another Lumbee ancestor, John Brooks, held the title to over 1,000 acres (400 ha) in 1735 and that Robert Lowrie gained possession of almost 700 acres (280 ha).

However, a state archivist noted in the late 20th century that no land grants were issued during these years in North Carolina. The first documented land grants made to individuals claimed to be Lumbee ancestors did not take place until the 1750s, more than a decade later. None of the various petitions for federal recognition by the Lumbee people has relied on the McMillan, Dial, or Eliades claims.

Land patents and deeds filed with the colonial administrations of Virginia, North Carolina, and South Carolina during that period show that individuals who claimed to be Lumbee ancestors migrated from southern parts of Virginia and northern parts of North Carolina. In the first federal census of 1790, the ancestors of the Lumbee were enumerated as Free Persons of Color, another term used for a wide variety of non-White people, including non-reservation American Indians, mixed race American Indian/European, and mixed race African/European. In 1800 and 1810, the families were classified as "all other free persons" in the census (after "white" and "black").

Land records show that in the second half of the 18th century, persons since identified as ancestral Lumbees began to take titles to land near Drowning Creek (Lumber River) and prominent swamps such as Ashpole, Long, and Back. According to James Campisi, the anthropologist hired by the Lumbee tribe to support their petition for federal recognition, the area "is located in the heart of the so-called old field of the Cheraw documented in land records between 1737 and 1739." The location of the Cheraw Old Fields is documented in the Lumbee petition for recognition based on Siouan descent, prepared by Lumbee River Legal Services in the 1980s. Other researchers have noted that the Cheraw Old Fields were only a few miles south of Robeson County North Carolina, into present-day Marlboro County South Carolina. In 1771, a convicted felon, by the name of Winsler Driggers, captured "near Drowning Creek, in the Charraw settlement," was reported as hanged under the Negro Act. That mention, along with no evidence that a new settlement was established or the old settlement was abandoned, is not sufficient to confirm that the settlement on Drowning Creek in 1754 was a Cheraw settlement.

American Revolution and federal era
Pension records for veterans of the American Revolutionary War in Robeson County listed men with surnames later associated with Lumbee families, such as Samuel Bell, Jacob Locklear, John Brooks, Berry Hunt, Thomas Jacobs, Thomas Cummings, and Michael Revels. In 1790, other men with surnames since associated with Lumbee-identified descendants, such as Barnes, Braveboy (or Brayboy), Bullard, Chavers (Chavis), Cumbo, Hammonds, Lowrie (Lowry/Lowery), Oxendine, Strickland, and Wilkins, were listed as inhabitants of the Fayetteville District; they were all "Free Persons of Color" in the first federal census.

Antebellum
Following Nat Turner's slave rebellion of 1831, the state legislature passed amendments to its original 1776 constitution, abolishing suffrage for free people of color. This was one of a series of laws passed by North Carolina whites from 1826 to the 1850s which the historian John Hope Franklin characterized as the "Free Negro Code", creating restrictions on that class. Free people of color were stripped of various civil and political rights which they had enjoyed for almost two generations. They could no longer vote or serve on juries, bear arms without a license from the state, or serve in the state militia. As these were obligations traditionally associated with citizenship, they were made second-class citizens.

In 1853, the North Carolina Supreme Court upheld the constitutionality of the state's restrictions to prevent free people of color from bearing arms without a license. Noel Locklear, identified as a free man of color in State v. Locklear, was convicted of being in illegal possession of firearms. In 1857, William Chavers from Robeson County was arrested and charged as a free person of color for carrying a shotgun without a license. Chavers, like Locklear, was convicted. Chavers promptly appealed, arguing that the law restricted only "free Negroes," not "persons of color from Indian blood." The appeals court reversed the lower court, finding that "free persons of color may be, then, for all we can see, persons colored by Indian blood".

Civil War
A yellow fever epidemic in 1862–1863 killed many slaves working on the construction of Fort Fisher near Wilmington, North Carolina, then considered to be the "Gibraltar of the South". As the state's slave owners resisted sending more slaves to Fort Fisher, the Confederate Home Guard intensified efforts to conscript able-bodied free persons of color as laborers. There does not appear to be documentation of conscription among the free people of color in Robeson County.

Some Lumbee ancestors are believed to have been forced to aid the Confederacy as laborers. Others are documented as drawing Confederate pensions for their service. The community says that many men tried to avoid such forced labor by hiding in the swamps. During that period, some men from Robeson County operated as guerrillas for the Union Army, sabotaging the efforts of the Confederacy and robbing local whites.

Lowry War

Early in the Civil War, North Carolina turned to forced labor to construct her defenses. Several Lowrie cousins had been conscripted as laborers to help build Fort Fisher, near Wilmington. Henry Berry Lowrie and several of his relatives took to the swamps where Indians resorted to "lying out" to avoid being rounded up by the Home Guard and forced to work as impressed laborers.

The Lowrie gang, as it became known, resorted to crime and conducting personal feuds, committing robberies and murders against white Robeson County residents and skirmishing with the Confederate Home Guard. They grew bolder as the war turned against the Confederacy. In December 1864, the Lowrie gang killed James P. Barnes after he had drafted workers, including the Lowries, for work on local defenses. Barnes had earlier accused Henry's father, Allen Lowrie, of stealing hogs. Next, the gang killed James Brantley Harris, a Confederate conscription officer who had killed a Lowrie relative.

A surprise search by the Home Guard of Allen Lowrie's home in March 1865 uncovered a stash of forbidden firearms. The Home Guard convened a summary court-martial, convicted Allen Lowrie and his son William of illegally possessing firearms as men of color, and executed them.

After the Civil War, the Lowrie gang continued their insurgency, committing robberies and murders. The authorities' raids and attempts to capture gang members became known as the Lowry War. The gang consisted of Henry Lowrie, his brothers Stephen and Thomas, cousins Calvin and Henderson Oxendine, two of Lowrie's brothers-in-law, two escaped slaves who had joined the Lowries, a white man of unknown identity who was likely a Confederate deserter, and two other men of unknown relation and identity.

On December 7, 1865, Henry Lowrie married Rhoda Strong. Arrested at his wedding, Lowrie escaped from jail by filing his way through the jail's bars.

Lowrie's gang continued its activities into the Reconstruction Era. Republican governor William Woods Holden declared Lowrie and his men outlaws in 1869, and offered a $12,000 reward for their capture: dead or alive. Lowrie responded with more revenge killings. Eluding capture, the Lowrie gang persisted after Reconstruction ended and conservative white Democrats gained control of North Carolina government, imposing segregation and white supremacy.

The Lowrie gang gained the sympathy of local Indian families and even some poor whites, who refused to cooperate with efforts to stop them. Records of the pursuit of the Lowrie gang provide the first documentation of the local people's claims on mixed Indian ancestry. These early accounts refer to the Lowries and the other local Indian families as being mixed Tuscarora/white. More than 150 years before, a large number of the Tuscarora people, who spoke an Iroquoian language, migrated north to New York to join their Iroquois cousins. The Tuscarora tribe in New York considers the migration complete by the year 1722; all the Tuscarora who remained in North Carolina are not considered under the same council fire, or tribal fraction. The large migration of Tuscarora people was a result of their defeat by the Carolina colonists and their Indian allies in the Tuscarora War.

In February 1872, shortly after a raid in which he robbed the local sheriff's safe of more than $28,000, Henry Berry Lowrie disappeared. It is claimed he accidentally shot himself while cleaning his double-barrel shotgun. As with many folk heroes, the death of Lowrie was disputed. He was reportedly seen at a funeral several years later. Without his leadership, all but two members of the Lowrie gang were subsequently hunted down, and either captured or killed.

State recognition as Indians
During Reconstruction, the legislature established public education for the first time, providing for white and black schools. All children of color were assigned to black schools, which were dominated by the children of freedmen (freed slaves). The Indian people of Robeson County had always been free and did not socially associate or interact with Blacks. They refused to send their children to school with the free Blacks and demanded for separate Indian schools. In the 1880s, as the Democratic Party was struggling against the biracial Populist movement which combined the strength of poor whites (Populist and Democrats) and blacks (mostly Republicans), Democratic state representative Hamilton MacMillan proposed to have the state recognize these Indian people of Robeson County as the "Croatan Indians" and to create a separate system of Croatan Indian schools. By the end of the 19th century, the "Indians of Robeson County" (as they then identified) established schools in eleven of their principal settlements.

An Indian school system

In 1887, the Indians of Robeson County petitioned the state legislature to establish a normal school to train Indian teachers for the county's Indian schools. With state permission, they raised the requisite funds, along with some state assistance, which proved inadequate. Several tribal leaders donated money and privately held land for schools. Robeson County's Indian Normal School eventually developed as Pembroke State University and subsequently as the University of North Carolina at Pembroke.

In 1899, North Carolina Congressional representatives introduced the first bill in Congress to appropriate federal funds to educate the Indian children of Robeson County. They introduced another bill a decade later, and yet another in 1911. The Commissioner of Indian Affairs, T. J. Morgan, responded to Congress and the Croatan Indians, writing that, "so long as the immediate wards of the Government [Indians on reservations] are so insufficiently provided for, I do not see how I can consistently render any assistance to the Croatans or any other civilized tribes." [sic, civilized tribes were defined in contrast to Indians on reservations, who were wards of the government.] Those Indians in the Southeast and elsewhere who were not on reservations, such as those in Robeson County, were considered to be United States citizens and thus the responsibility of state governments. The federal government funded Indian education only for Indians on reservations.

By the first decade of the 20th century, a North Carolina Representative introduced a federal bill to establish "a normal school for the Indians of Robeson County, North Carolina," to be paid for by the federal government. Charles F. Pierce, U.S. Supervisor of Indian Schools in the Bureau of Indian Affairs, opposed the legislation since, "[a]t the present time it is the avowed policy of the government to require states having an Indian population to assume the burden and responsibility for their education, so far as is possible."

Ku Klux Klan conflict

During the 1950s, the Lumbee made nationwide news when they came into conflict with the Knights of the Ku Klux Klan, a white supremacist terrorist organization, then headed by Grand Dragon James W. "Catfish" Cole. Cole began a campaign of harassment against the Lumbee, claiming they were "mongrels and half-breeds" whose "race mixing" threatened to upset the established order of the segregated Jim Crow South. After giving a series of speeches denouncing the "loose morals" of Lumbee women, Cole burned a cross in the front yard of a Lumbee woman in St. Pauls, North Carolina, as a "warning" against "race mixing". Emboldened, Cole called for a Klan rally on January 18, 1958, near the town of Maxton. The Lumbee, led by veterans of the Second World War, decided to disrupt the rally.

The "Battle of Hayes Pond", also known as "the Klan Rout", made national news. Cole had predicted more than 5,000 Klansmen would show up for the rally, but fewer than 100 and possibly as few as three dozen attended. Approximately 500 Lumbee, armed with guns and sticks, gathered in a nearby swamp, and when they realized they possessed an overwhelming numerical advantage, attacked the Klansmen. The Lumbee encircled the Klansmen, opening fire and wounding four Klansmen in the first volley, none seriously. The remaining Klansmen panicked and fled. Cole was found in the swamps, arrested and tried for inciting a riot. The Lumbee celebrated the victory by burning Klan regalia and dancing around the open flames.

The Battle of Hayes Pond, which marked the end of Klan activity in Robeson County, is celebrated as a Lumbee holiday.

Early efforts to gain federal recognition

The people achieved state recognition as "Croatan Indians" in 1885. They first petitioned the federal government for recognition in 1888, but were rejected due to the Bureau of Indian Affairs' lack of funding. In 1911, at the request of the tribe, the North Carolina General Assembly passed legislation changing their name to "Indians of Robeson County." In 1913, over the objections of the existing federally recognized Cherokee Nation tribes in Oklahoma, the North Carolina legislators, based on a petition lobbied for and created by the Croatans, added "Cherokee" to the name of the Robeson County tribe. The tribe petitioned for federal recognition as "Cherokee" Indians, but it was denied. From 1913 to 1932, North Carolina legislators introduced bills in Congress as petitioned for by the Croatan faction to change the name of the people to Cherokee and gain federal recognition, but did not succeed.

In the early 20th century, North Carolina requested federal assistance to collect information related to the status of Indians in the state. The Southeast tribes had been subject to Indian removal in the 1830s, and were assigned to reservations in Oklahoma. Those Indians remaining in the state were considered state and federal citizens; there were no Indian reservations in the state. The legislature was chiefly reviewing issues related to the state's treatment of the Cherokee descendants who lived in the state.

In 1915, the report of Special Indian Agent O.M. McPherson of the Bureau of Indian Affairs, was sent to the North Carolina legislature. He primarily reported on the Cherokee in the state. He noted that the Indians of Robeson County had developed an extensive system of schools and a political organization. He thought that, as state-recognized Indians, they were eligible to attend federal Indian schools. But, as they were highly assimilated, spoke English, and already worked in the common state culture, he doubted that the federal Indian schools could meet their needs. Congress did not provide any additional funding to support education for Indians in North Carolina.

In 1924, the Cherokee Indians of North Carolina petitioned for federal recognition as "Siouan Indians"; their request was rejected by the Bureau of Indian Affairs. The Congressional committees continued to refuse to have the federal government assume educational responsibility for the Indians of Robeson County, as they were state citizens and part of that jurisdiction's responsibility.

Federally commissioned reports
In the 20th century, numerous federally commissioned studies related to the Lumbee were conducted by anthropologists, ethnologists, and historians. They reflect changing concepts of what constituted Indian identity. In 1912, legislation was introduced to the US Senate to establish a school for the Indians of Robeson County. When the bill was sent to committee, it requested information from the Department of the Interior. The Indian Office sent Charles F. Pierce, the Supervisor of Indian Schools, to Robeson County to conduct a study of the tribe. Pierce reported that the state and county were providing funds to educate the 1,976 school-age Indian children. He also stated in his report that "one would readily class a large majority [of the Lumbee] as being at least three-fourths Indian.

On April 28, 1914, the Senate called for an investigation into the status and conditions of the Indians of Robeson and adjoining counties. The Indian Office sent Special Indian Agent O.M. McPherson to the county to obtain information regarding the educational system of the tribe. In his report, submitted to the Senate on January 4, 1915, he wrote:

While these Indians are essentially an agricultural people, I believe them to be as capable of learning the mechanical trades as the average white youth. The foregoing facts suggest the character of the educational institution that should be established for them, in case Congress sees fit to make the necessary appropriation, namely the establishment of an agricultural and mechanical school, in which domestic science shall also be taught.

Anthropologist John R. Swanton  reported on possible origins of the Indians of Robeson County in his work on Southeast Indians. He wrote:

The evidence available thus seems to indicate that the Indians of Robeson County who have been called Croatan and Cherokee are descended mainly from certain Siouan tribes of which the most prominent were the Cheraw and Keyauwee, but they probably included as well remnants of the Eno, and Shakori, and very likely some of the coastal groups such as the Waccamaw and Cape Fears. It is not improbable that a few families or small groups of Algonquian or Iroquoian may have cast their lot with this body of people, but contributions from such sources are relatively insignificant. Although there is some reason to think that the Keyauwee tribe actually contributed more blood to the Robeson County Indians than any other, the name is not widely known, whereas that of the Cheraw has been familiar to historians, geographers and ethnologists in one form or another since the time of De Soto and has a firm position in the cartography of the region. The Cheraws, too, seem to have taken a leading part in opposing the colonists during and immediately after the Yamasee uprising. Therefore, if the name of any tribe is to be used in connection with this body of six or eight thousand people, that of the Cheraw would, in my opinion, be most appropriate.

In 1935, Indian Agent Fred Baker was sent to Robeson County in response to a proposed resettlement project for the Cherokee Indians of Robeson County. At the time, the people were attempting to organize as a tribe under the Indian Reorganization Act of 1934, which largely applied to Indians on reservations to encourage their self-government.

Baker reported:

I find that the sense of racial solidarity is growing stronger and that the members of this tribe are cooperating more and more with each other with the object in view of promoting the mutual benefit of all the members. It is clear to my mind that sooner of later government action will have to be taken in the name of justice and humanity to aid them.

D'Arcy McNickle, from the Bureau of Indian Affairs, came to Robeson County in 1936 to collect affidavits and other data from people registering as Indian under the Indian Reorganization Act of 1934. McNickle stated, "there are reasons for believing that until comparatively recently some remnant of language still persisted among these people."

In the 1960s, Smithsonian ethnologists William Sturtevant and Samuel Stanley described the Lumbee as "larger than any other Indian group in the United States except the Navajo", and estimated their population as 31,380 Lumbee (from North and South Carolina) in 1960.

Indian New Deal
The federal Indian Reorganization Act in 1934 was chiefly directed at Native American tribes on reservations. It encouraged them to re-establish self-government, which had been diminished since the founding of reservations and the supervision by the federal Bureau of Indian Affairs.

At this time, the Indians of Robeson County renewed their petition for federal recognition as a tribe. The Bureau of Indian Affairs (BIA) sent John R. Swanton, an anthropologist from the Bureau of American Ethnology, and the Indian Agent Fred Baker to evaluate the claim of the Indians of Robeson County to historical continuity as an identified Indian community. In 1934, the future Lumbee revived their claim to Cherokee identity, joining the National Congress of American Indians under the name, "Cherokee Indians of Robeson County."

Swanton speculated that the group were more likely descended in part from Cheraw and other eastern Siouan tribes, as these were the predominant Native American peoples historically in that area. The Indians of Robeson County split in terms of how they identified as Native Americans: one group supported the Cheraw theory of ancestry. The other faction believed they were descended from the Cherokee, although the tribe had historically occupied territory in the mountains and western part of the state rather than the area of Robeson County. North Carolina's politicians abandoned support for the federal recognition effort until the tribal factions agreed on their identity.

In 1952, under the leadership of D.F. Lowrie, the tribe voted to adopt the name "Lumbee." The North Carolina legislature recognized the name change in 1953. The tribe petitioned again for federal recognition.

Lumbee Act
The Lumbee Act, also known as H.R. 4656, passed by Congress in late May 1956 as a concession to political lobbying and signed by President Dwight D. Eisenhower, designated the Lumbee as an Indian people. It withheld full recognition as a "Tribe", as had been agreed to by the Lumbee leaders. The Lumbee Act designated the Indians of Robeson, Hoke, Scotland, and Cumberland counties as the "Lumbee Indians of North Carolina."

It provided further, "as requested by the Lumbee HR 4656 stipulated that '[n]othing in this Act shall make such Indians eligible for any services performed by the United States for Indians because of their status as Indians.'" It also forbids a Government relationship with the Lumbee and forbids them from applying through the BARS, the BIA administrative process to gain recognition. This restriction as to eligibility for services was a condition which tribal representatives agreed to at the time in order to achieve status as a recognized tribe and have the Lumbee name recognized. The Lumbee had essentially assimilated into early colonial life prior to the formation of the United States. They lived as individuals, as did any other colonial and U.S. citizens. Lumbee spokesmen repeatedly testified at these hearings that they were not seeking federal financial benefits; they said they only wanted a name designation as Lumbee people.

Petitioning for full federal recognition
In 1987, the Lumbee petitioned the United States Department of the Interior for full federal recognition. This is a prerequisite to receive the financial benefits accorded federally recognized Native American tribes. The latter have generally been those tribes who had signed treaties with the federal government and had reservations established, and a history of a tribal relationship with the federal government. The petition was denied because of the Lumbee Act.

The Lumbee resumed lobbying Congress, testifying in 1988, 1989, 1991 and 1993 in efforts to gain full federal recognition by congressional action. All of these attempts failed in the face of opposition by the Department of Interior, the recognized Cherokee tribes (including North Carolina's Eastern Band of Cherokee Indians), some of the North Carolina Congressional delegation, and some representatives from other states with federally recognized tribes. Some of the North Carolina delegation separately recommended an amendment to the 1956 Act that would enable the Lumbee to apply to the Department of Interior under the regular administrative process for recognition. In 2004 and 2006 the tribe made renewed bids for full recognition, to include financial benefits.

In 2007, US Senator Elizabeth Dole from North Carolina introduced the Lumbee Recognition Bill. It was not enacted. Lumbee Tribal Chairman Jimmy Goins appeared before the United States Senate Committee on Indian Affairs in September 2007 to lobby for federal recognition of the tribe. Goins testified on the Lumbee's decades-long efforts to gain recognition.

On January 6, 2009, US Representative Mike McIntyre introduced legislation (H.R. 31) to grant the Lumbee full federal recognition. The bill gained support of more than 180 co-sponsors, including both North Carolina US Senators (Richard Burr and Kay Hagan). On June 3, 2009, the United States House of Representatives voted 240 to 179 for federal recognition for the Lumbee tribe, acknowledging that they are descendants of the historic Cheraw tribe. The bill went to the United States Senate. On October 22, 2009, the United States Senate Committee on Indian Affairs approved a bill for federal recognition of the Lumbee that also included a no-gaming clause. The Senate adjourned for 2010 without taking action on the bill.

In 2021, Senator Brian Schatz of Hawaii sought a hearing on Lumbee federal recognition. On April 22, 2021, US Representative G. K. Butterfield introduced legislation to grant the Lumbee full federal recognition (H.R. 2758) and the bill passed the House of Representatives on November 1, 2021.

2020 Presidential Election
During the 2020 Presidential Election campaign, then-candidate Joe Biden announced, on October 8, 2020, his support for federal recognition of the Lumbee tribe by pledging his backing to the Lumbee Recognition Act. Two weeks later, on October 21, 2020, President Donald Trump also announced his support for federal recognition of the tribe via the same legislation. The following weekend, Trump held a rally in Robeson County to shore up support among Native Americans. During the rally, Trump stated that "[The] Lumbee Nation is forgotten no more!" Trump's rally was significant in that it was the first official visit to Robeson County by a sitting US President in history.

Historically most of Robeson County had trended Democratic, voting for Barack Obama by an 18 point margin in 2012. However, Donald Trump carried the county narrowly in 2016, winning by a 5 point margin over Hillary Clinton. In 2020, his margin of victory increased dramatically to an 18 point victory over Biden. Many attribute this swing in Trump's favor to his visit and explicit support for recognition of the tribe by the federal government.

Theories of origins

Lost Colony of Roanoke
In 1885, the Democratic politician Hamilton MacMillan proposed the theory that the Native inhabitants of Robeson County were descendants of England's "Lost Colony of Roanoke", who intermarried with what he described as the "Croatan Indians." The Roanoke colony disappeared during a difficult winter, but the colonists reportedly left the word "Croatan" carved into a tree, hence the name MacMillan gave to the proto Lumbee.

MacMillan's theory was part of a Reconstruction era effort to woo the proto Lumbee to the Democratic Party by creating an "Indian" school system that would free these new "Croatan Indians" from sending their children to school with the children of the recently emancipated slaves.

By the early 1900s, Robeson County whites used "Cro" as a racial epithet to describe their "Indian" neighbors. The Lost Colony theory of origins fell out of favor in the early twentieth century. "Croatan" was dropped from their tribal name and replaced by "Indians of Robeson County", although Lumbee historian Adolph Dial continued to advocate for the theory in the 1980s.

Cherokee descent
The proto Lumbee first began identifying as Cherokee Indians in 1915, when they changed their name to the "Cherokee Indians of Robeson County." Four years earlier, they had changed their name from the "Croatan Indians" to the generic "Indians of Robeson County." But the Cherokee occupied much further to the west and in the mountains during the colonial era.

In his unpublished 1934 master's thesis, graduate student Clifton Oxendine theorized that the Lumbee descended from Iroquoian-speaking Cherokee. Citing "oral traditions," Oxendine suggested that the Lumbee were the descendants of Cherokee warriors who fought with the British under Colonel John Barnwell of South Carolina in the Tuscarora campaign of 1711–1713. He said the Cherokee settled in the swamps of Robeson County when the campaign ended, along with some Tuscarora captives.

The Oxendine theory of Cherokee origin has been uniformly rejected by mainstream scholars. First, no Cherokee warriors are listed in the record of Barnwell's company. Second, the Lumbee do not speak Cherokee or any other Indian language. Third, Oxendine's claims of oral traditions are completely unsubstantiated; no such oral traditions survive or are documented by any other scholar.

The Lumbee have abandoned this theory in their documentation supporting their effort to obtain federal tribal recognition. The federally recognized Eastern Band of Cherokee Indians categorically rejects any connection to the Lumbee, dismissing the Oxendine claims as "absurd" and disputing even that the Lumbee qualify as Native American.

Cheraw descent
Shortly after abandoning the Croatan label and changing their name to the generic "Indians of Robeson County", the proto Lumbee seized on the speculations of Indian agent McPherson that they may be related to the defunct Cheraw, a band of Siouan-speaking Indians that had been reduced by war and disease to 50 or 60 individuals by 1768.

The 1915 McPherson Report said in reference to the Cheraw (quoting the Handbook of American Indians, 1906):

Their numbers in 1715, according to Rivers, was 510, but this estimate probably included the Keyauwee. Being still subject to attack by the Iroquois, they finally—between 1726 and 1739—became incorporated with the Catawba ... They are mentioned as with the Catawba but speaking their own distinct dialect as late as 1743 (Adair). The last notice of them in 1768, when their remnant, reduced by war and disease to 50 or 60, were still living with the Catawba.

The Catawba are a federally recognized tribe. The McPherson Report does not explain how or when the remaining four or five dozen Cheraw identified in 1768 separated from the Catawba and became the ancestors of the Lumbee.

Siouan descent
After repeated rejections under the Croatan, Cherokee and Cheraw labels, the proto Lumbee petitioned the United States Bureau of Indian Affairs in 1924 for recognition as "Siouan" Indians. This refers to Siouan language-speaking groups, not the Sioux, an Indigenous people of the Great Plains. This petition was rejected largely on the grounds that Siouan was a language, not a tribe. Moreover, there was no record of the Lumbee or their ancestors having ever spoken the Siouan or any other Indian language.

Keyauwee descent
In 1933, John Swanton wrote that the Siouan-speaking Keyauwee and Cheraw of the Carolina Piedmont were the most likely Indian ancestors of the people known from 1885 to 1912 as Croatan Indians and later as the Indians of Robeson County. He suggested that surviving descendants of the Waccamaw and the Woccon likely lived in the central coastal region of North Carolina. In the 21st century, these tribes are extinct as groups, except for a small band of Waccamaw that live on Lake Waccamaw and have been recognized by the state.

Swanton traced the migration of Southeast tribes. In addition to the Keyauwee, Cheraw, Bear River, Waccamaw, and Woccon already mentioned, he noted that the Eno and Waxhaw migrated from Piedmont South Carolina northeast to the north-central part of North Carolina, then back south again to a point on the Pee Dee River just south of the border of the two Carolinas.

By the 1770s, remnant Indians from the once distinct tribal communities of the Cheraw, Keyauwee, Hatteras, Waxhaw, Sugaree, Eno and Shakori gathered along the Lumbee River, near the border that now divides North and South Carolina. Some of these Indians moved further southward to join with the few surviving Catawba, but the majority settled near the pines, web of wetlands, and river that bear the name of the Lumbee. Over time in a process of ethnogenesis, they identified as a common people.

Authenticity and doubts of origins 
Due to their lack of an obvious single ancestor tribe and other conventional indigenous cultural markers such as a unique language, Lumbee people are often confronted with doubts concerning the sincerity and genuineness of their claims to indigenous status. Some white and black residents of Robeson County have expressed doubts about their origins, asserting that the Lumbee are descendants of white and black people who do not want to be viewed as black. Some federally-recognized tribes have endorsed the extension of recognition to the Lumbee, while others have opposed it, accusing the Lumbee of making fraudulent claims to indigenous ancestry. Several tribes from the western United States also promulgate the belief that the Lumbee are a mixed, mostly African-descent group. Some Lumbee have undergone genetic testing which has not demonstrated indigenous ancestry. Historian Malinda Maynor Lowery, a member of the Lumbee Tribe of North Carolina, criticized the usefulness of such tests, stating that the testing companies lack base samples of the Lumbee's indigenous ancestors' DNA with which the results can be compared. Some Lumbee report that the doubts about their status have caused emotional and psychological harm in their community.

Geographic dispersion 
The Lumbee are heavily concentrated in Robeson County, North Carolina on the southern border of the state. Over the years, the Lumbee have migrated to other areas primarily for employment. Sizeable Lumbee settlements are in Cumberland, Sampson, Hoke, Scotland, and Columbus counties.

Culture and traditions

Surnames 
Locklear, Oxendine, Lowry, Hunt, Chavis, Brayboy, and Bullard are common Lumbee surnames.

Language
Lumbee people speak both mainstream varieties of English and a vernacular form, Lumbee English. The latter is not a Native American language, but rather a form of American Indian English. In 2020, the ISO 639-3 language code lmz was retired from use, as it was determined that no separate Lumbee language has ever existed. Linguists have speculated that the ancestors of the Lumbees had been native peoples who had originally spoken the Cheraw dialect of the Eastern Siouan language prior to adopting English sometime before the early 1700s. Lumbee people encountered English-speaking European settlers and adopted their language much earlier than other Native American groups. The Lumbee Act of 1956 specifically mentioned the dialect as a defining attribute of the people.

Lumbee dialectal English descends from the English spoken by the British English, Highland Scots, and Scots-Irish. Probably due to this heritage, it shares similarities with the High Tider accent found in the Outer Banks, namely in use of the  sound where other English speakers use , the use of the word  ('to mess up'), and the grammatical use of weren't (e.g. "she weren't here"). Lumbee dialect also makes use of several unique words and phrases: chauld ('embarrassed'); on the swamp ('in the neighborhood');  (sling shot); and bog (a serving of chicken and rice). Grammatically, Lumbee dialect employs the word bes as a verb form (e.g. "it bes really crowded"). There is a variation in the use of these elements among Lumbee people; some frequently use most of the vernacular's unique characteristics, while others use few of them but easily understand their meaning. The vernacular has also evolved over time, with older speakers frequently using the  sound and a-prefixing verbs, while the grammatical use of weren't has been retained and strengthened in use among younger speakers.

Lumbee Homecoming

Lumbee Homecoming is a celebration held annually in Pembroke since 1968. Homecoming is important in bringing together members of families, many from great distances, for a weeklong celebration of Lumbee culture. Festivities include a parade, a pow wow, pageants, and other cultural events. 2018 marked the 50th anniversary of the homecoming and saw crowds of over 20,000 spectators, including the Governor of North Carolina, Roy Cooper.

Communities
Lumbee communities were linked together by their extensive kinship ties, church affiliations, their sense of themselves as Indians, and their control of their educational system, all of which served as a mechanism for defining tribal membership and maintaining tribal boundaries. Communities are basically self-governing. One form of self-governance in the early 20th century was exhibited by a fraternal organization known as the Red Men's Lodge. By 1914, lodges existed in Prospect, Magnolia, Pembroke, Saddletree, Oxendine, and Union Chapel. Lodge members maintained social order, carried out ceremonies, marched in parades, and conducted funerals. The 1987 Lumbee Petition states that, "[w]ith so many prominent leaders it is easy to understand how the lodges could maintain order and, at the same time, protect the tribal members from organized violence from whites in the area".

Lumbee patchwork
In the late 19th century, Maggie Lowry Locklear (Lumbee), daughter of Henry Berry Lowry, created a unique patchwork quilt inspired by the longleaf pine. Her quilt is in the collection of the Museum of the Southeast American Indian at the University of North Carolina at Pembroke.

In 1993, Hayes Alan Locklear (Lumbee) designed a dress, which was sewn by Kat Littleturtle (Lumbee) for Miss Lumbee Natascha Wagoner, who was chosen as the 8th Miss Indian USA. The dress featured a pinecone patchwork pattern inspired by Maggie Lowry Locklear's quilt. Since then, Lumbee women have adopted this pinecone patchwork dress style as the signature Lumbee dress.

Cuisine 

Traditional Lumbee cuisine heavily intersects with Southern cuisine. Chicken and pastry is a mainstay of Lumbee food, as is cornbread. The collard sandwich—consisting of fried cornbread, collard greens, and fatback—is a popular dish among the Lumbee in Robeson County. It is sometimes served with chow-chow.

Religion
Today the Lumbee primarily practice Protestantism, and attending church is an important social activity. Churches have Sunday schools, youth organizations, senior citizens' programs, Bible study programs, and choir practices. Gospel songs are popular. Ministers are highly respected. When a sizeable number of Lumbee people move to a city, they tend to settle in a particular section or neighborhood and establish a church. This took place in Lumbee communities in Baltimore, Greensboro, Fayetteville, Charlotte, and Claxton, Georgia.

A study has documented Lumbee Methodism back to 1787. Lumbees created two church conferences of Indian congregations — the Burnt Swamp Baptist Association, founded around 1880, and the Lumbee River Conference of the Holiness Methodist Association in 1900. In 1984 Bruce Barton documented 104 Lumbee churches. Prospect United Methodist Church, with 1,008 members in 2017, has purportedly the largest congregation of Native Americans in the United States.

Lumbee Tribe of North Carolina 

The Lumbee Tribe of North Carolina is one of eight state-recognized Native American tribes in North Carolina. They participate at the state level in many ways, including in the North Carolina Commission of Indian Affairs. They also participate in such national organizations as the National Congress of American Indians and the National Indian Education Association.

According to its constitution, adopted in 2000, the Lumbee tribal government is organized into three branches: the tribal chairperson (executive), the 21-member Tribal Council (legislative), and Supreme Court (judicial). The tribal chairperson and the Tribal Council are elected to three-year terms.

The current administration includes:
 Chairman: John Lowery
 Administrator: Tammy Maynor
 Administration Assistant to Chairman: Camera Brewer
 Enrollment Director: Reena Locklear.

Unrecognized organizations 
Some unrecognized organizations identify as being Lumbee. One, the United Lumbee Nation of North Carolina and America, based in Exeter, California, petitioned for federal recognition in 1980. The final determination was that the group "does not exist as an Indian tribe" and that they did not descend from any Lumbee community.

See also
List of notable Lumbee

Notes

References
"Bad medicine for the Klan: North Carolina Indians break up Kluxers' anti-Indian meeting", Life, 44 (27 January 1958), pp. 26–28.
Blu, Karen I. The Lumbee Problem: The Making of an American Indian People. Lincoln: University of Nebraska Press, 2001. .
Dial, Adolph L. and David K. Eliades. The Only Land I Know: A History of the Lumbee Indians, Syracuse University Press, 1996. .
Eliades, David K., Oxendine, Linda E., and Locklear, Lawrence T. "Hail to UNCP! A 125-Year History of the University of North Carolina at Pembroke". Chapel Hill, NC: Chapel Hill Press, 2014. .
Evans, William McKee. To Die Game: The Story of the Lowry Band: Indian Guerillas of Reconstruction. Baton Rouge: Louisiana State University Press, 1977. .
Hauptman, Laurence M. "River Pilots and Swamp Guerillas: Pamunkey and Lumbee Unionists," in Between Two Fires: American Indians in the Civil War. New York: Free Press, 1995. .
Hawks, Francis. History of North Carolina. Vol. I. Fayetteville, NC: E.J. Hale & Son, 1858.
Hoffman, Margaret M. Colony of North Carolina (1735–1764), Abstracts of Land Patents, Volume I. Roanoke Rapids, NC: Roanoke News Company, 1982. .
Houghton, Richard H., III. "The Lumbee: 'Not a Tribe,' The Nation. 257.21 (20 December 1993)
 Knick, Stanley G. 1988 Robeson Trails Archaeological Survey: Reconnaissance in Robeson County; Native American Resource Center Publications; UNC Pembroke.
 Knick, Stanley G. 1993 Robeson Crossroads Archaeological Survey: Intensive Testing; Native American Resource Center Publications; UNC Pembroke.
 Knick, Stanley G. 2008 Because It Is Right; Native South 1 (2008): 80-89. (http://muse.jhu.edu/journals/native_south/v001/1.knick.html).
Lawson, John. A New Voyage to Carolina. Chapel Hill: University of North Carolina, 1967. .
Locklear, Lawrence T. "Down by the Ol' Lumbee: An Investigation into the Origin and Use of the Word 'Lumbee' Prior to 1952.", Native South 3 (2010): 103-117.
McMillan, Hamilton. Sir Walter Raleigh's Lost Colony: An Historical Sketch of the Attempts of Sir Walter Raleigh to Establish a Colony in Virginia, with the Traditions of an Indian Tribe in North Carolina. Indicating the Fate of the Colony of Englishmen Left on Roanoke Island in 1587, Wilson, NC: Advance Press, 1888.
McPherson, O.M. online text Report on Condition and Tribal Rights of the Indians of Robeson and Adjoining Counties of North Carolina, 63rd Congress, 3rd session, January 5, 1915. Senate Document 677 (This was submitted to the legislature of North Carolina, as they were considering issues related especially to the Cherokee and other tribal groups).
Milling, Chapman J. Red Carolinians. Chapel Hill: University of North Carolina Press, 1940.
Norment, Mary C. The Lowrie History, As Acted in Part by Henry Berry Lowrie, the Great North Carolina Bandit. Weldon, NC: Harrell's Printing House, 1895.
Oxendine, Clifton. A Social and Economic History of the Indians of Robeson County North Carolina, unpublished M.A. thesis, George Peabody College for Teachers, 1934.
Rights, Douglas L. The American Indian in North Carolina. Winston-Salem: John F. Blair, 1957.
Ross, Thomas E. American Indians in North Carolina: Geographic Interpretations, Southern Pines: Karo Hollow Press, 1999. .
Sider, Gerald M. Living Indian Histories: Lumbee and Tuscarora People in North Carolina. Chapel Hill: University of North Carolina Press, 2003 (reprint). .
Thomas, Robert K. "A Report on Research of Lumbee Origins."; Lumbee River Legal Services. The Lumbee petition. Prepared in cooperation with the Lumbee Tribal Enrollment Office. Julian T. Pierce and Cynthia Hunt-Locklear, authors. Jack Campisi and Wesley White, consultants. Pembroke: Lumbee River Legal Services, 1987.
Townsend, George Alfred. The Swamp Outlaws, or, The North Carolina Bandits: Being a Complete History of the Modern Rob Roys and Robin Hoods, New York: Robert M. DeWitt, 1872.
U.S. Bureau of the Census. The First Census of the U.S.: 1790. Heads of Families at the First Census of the United States: North Carolina. Washington, DC: Government Printing Office, 1908.
 
 
 
Cameron, Jno. D. "The Croatan Indians of Robeson," North Carolina: The Fayetteville Observer, February 12, 1885
Gorman, C. John "Gorman Papers," State archives, c. 1875 and with the Gorman family, Durham N.C. c. 1917
 History of the Old Cheraws, Alexander Gregg (1819-1893)

External links

Native American Resource Center, UNC Pembroke The Museum of the Southeast American Indian
Tuscarora Nation One Fire Council, Official Website
The Center for Lumbee Studies
"Lumbee Language and the Lumbee Indian Culture", Native Languages
"The Lumbee Indians": An annotated bibliography
"Lumbee for Kids"
Strike at the Wind Outdoor Drama

Lumbee
Native American tribes in North Carolina
Robeson County, North Carolina
State-recognized tribes in the United States